The Muppet Alphabet Album is a Sesame Street learning album based on the children's television series. It was first released in 1971 by Columbia, then reissued in 1976, and by Golden Music in 1990, and by Sony Wonder in 1996, and by Koch Records in 2008. Sony Wonder and Koch Records's reissues included Elmo singing a version of the song, "ABC-DEF-GHI", and called it "Sing the Alphabet". The album features one song for each letter in the alphabet, performed by a variety of Sesame Street characters. Each of the songs uses a different musical style.

Jim Henson, one of the album's producers, included a short description of the project on the album jacket of the initial release: "The idea is very simple – a little song or skit about each of the twenty-six letters of the alphabet..". A short history of the production process was later posted to a posthumous blog representing his estate.

Side A
ABC-DEF-GHI, with Elmo
 "The Sound of the Letter A", with Big Bird
 "Oscar's B Sandwich", with Farley/Oscar the Grouch
 "C is for Cookie", with Cookie Monster and his friends
 "Dee, Dee, Dee", with Ernie
 E What's My Letter, with Prairie Dawn/Guy Smiley
 "Four Furry Friends", with Cookie Monster/Herry Monster/Grover/Oscar the Grouch
 "Two G Sounds", with Grover/An unknown Sesame Street Muppet
 "Ha Ha", with Big Bird/Harvey/Herry Monster
 "I Stand Up Straight and Tall", with Grover
 "J Friends", with the Anything Muppets
 "K Herbet's Silly Poem", with Herbert Birdsfoot
 "La La La", with Bert & Ernie
 "M-M-M Monster Meal", with Cookie/Herry Monster
 "The Noodle Story", with Big Bird/Oscar the Grouch

Side B
 "Would You Like to Buy an O?", with Lefty & Ernie
 "P My Favorite Letter", with the Anything Muppets
 "The Question Song", with Grover/Another unknown Sesame Street Muppet
 "The R Machine", with Bert & Ernie. Laugh along with Ernie while during the song
 "Sammy the Snake", with Sammy
 "The Tale of Tom Tattertall Tuttletut", with Herbert Birdsfoot and the Anything Muppets
 "U Lecture", with Professor Hastings & Ernie. Laugh along with Ernie and Professor Hastings while during the song
 "Very, Very Special Letter", with Big Bird
 "The National Association of W Lovers", with Bert
 "X Marks the Spot", with Sherlock Hemlock
 "Y Just Because", with Grover/Another unknown Sesame Street Muppet
 "Zizzy Zoomers", with the Zizzy Zoomers

Muppet Performers
 Caroll Spinney - Big Bird and Oscar the Grouch
 Jim Henson - Ernie, Guy Smiley, J Friend #2, Zizzy Zoomer #1, Tom Tattertall Tuttletutt, and Anything Muppet #2
 Frank Oz - Bert, Grover, Cookie Monster, Lefty the Salesman, Harvey Kneeslapper, Professor Hastings, J Friend #4, Zizzy Zoomer #3, and Anything Muppet #3
 Jerry Nelson - Herry Monster, Herbert Birdsfoot, Sherlock Hemlock, Farley, George, J Friend #1, Zizzy Zoomer #2, Sammy the Snake, Ambercrombie the Ant, "What's My Letter?" Announcer, and Anything Muppet #1
 Fran Brill - Prairie Dawn, Little Girl, Singer, and J Friend #3
 Jerry Juhl - Queen (uncredited)
 Joe Raposo - Additional Voices (uncredited)
 Jeff Moss - Additional Voices (uncredited)
 Kevin Clash - Elmo

References 

1971 albums
Sesame Street albums